The individual show jumping at the 1992 Summer Olympics took place between 4 and 9 August at the Real Club de Polo de Barcelona. The event was open to men and women. There were 87 competitors from 30 nations. Each nation could have up to 4 riders. The event was won by Ludger Beerbaum of Germany, the nation's second victory in individual jumping (tying the United States for third-most among nations behind France's four and Italy's three). It was the third consecutive Games at which Germany competed that the nation reached the podium in the event—gold in 1936 and bronze in 1952 (with no Games in 1940 or 1944, Germany disinvited in 1948, and either United Team of Germany or separate West Germany and East Germany teams competing from 1956 to 1988). Piet Raymakers earned the Netherlands' first medal in the event with his silver. The United States reached the podium for the third consecutive Games with Norman Dello Joio's bronze.

Background

This was the 19th appearance of the event, which had first been held at the 1900 Summer Olympics and has been held at every Summer Olympics at which equestrian sports have been featured (that is, excluding 1896, 1904, and 1908). It is the oldest event on the current programme, the only one that was held in 1900. The team and individual events were interrelated for the first time since 1964.

Eight of the top 13 (including a six-way tie for 7th) riders from the 1988 Games returned: fourth-place finisher Anne Kursinski of the United States, sixth-place finisher Jaime Azcárraga of Mexico, and seventh-place finishers Jan Tops and Jos Lansink of the Netherlands, Nick Skelton of Great Britain, Franke Sloothaak of West Germany (now competing for united Germany), and Markus Fuchs and Thomas Fuchs of Switzerland. The reigning World Champion was Eric Navet of France.

Croatia, the Philippines, South Africa, and the Virgin Islands each made their debut in the event. Some former Soviet republics competed together as the Unified Team. France competed for the 17th time, most of any nation.

Competition format

The competition underwent a significant format change for the second time in as many Games. For the first time since 1964, the team and individual events overlapped in the use of results. The format expanded to a total of five runs, now using three runs for the qualifying round and two runs for the final. The first two qualifying round runs counted toward the team competition.

All riders competed in the first two runs of the qualifying round. The field was then cut to 56 riders (based on the combined score for the first two runs) for the third run of the qualifying round, with each nation limited to three riders advancing. The three-run total counted as the qualifying score. Half of the riders (44 of the 87) advanced to the final. Positive scoring was used for each of the qualifying runs.

The final consisted of two runs. Both runs used the traditional fault scoring. Only the top 22 (half of the 44 finalists) riders advanced from the first run of the final to the second. The total of the two runs was used for the final score. A jump-off would be used if necessary to break ties for medal positions; other ties would not be broken.

Schedule

All times are Central European Summer Time (UTC+2)

Results

Martínez (Spain) and Robert (France) did not advance due to the three-rider limit per nation in the final.

Four riders cleared the first round of the final with no faults: Beerbaum, Raymakers, Dello Joio, and Whitaker. Whitaker had 19.25 faults in the second run. Dello Joio had 4.75 faults in the second run, the fourth-best result in that run to finish third overall (Tops, with 4 faults, had been better in the second run but finished fifth overall with 4.25 faults in the first resulting in a total of 8.25). Beerbaum and Raymakers both finished the second run without any obstacle faults, but Raymakers exceeded the time limit by 0.66 seconds resulting in a quarter-point fault. That timing fault was the difference between the two men as Beerbaum received gold and Raymakers silver.

References

 Official Report, pp. 174–76.

Equestrian at the 1992 Summer Olympics